Seppl-Herberger-Stadion is a multi-use stadium in Mannheim, Germany . It was initially used as the stadium of SV Waldhof Mannheim matches.  It was replaced by Carl-Benz-Stadion in 1994.  The capacity of the stadium is 15,200. The former name was Stadion am Alsenweg, in 1996 it was renamed.

External links
 Stadium information

Football venues in Germany
SV Waldhof Mannheim
Sports venues in Baden-Württemberg